Longfleet is a small district of Poole, Dorset centred on Longfleet Road.  It is situated directly north of the town centre and lies to the east of Oakdale and to the south and west of Parkstone.

History
The area of Longfleet was originally part of the Manor of Canford and mentioned in the Pipe Rolls of 1230.  It became a parish of its own right in 1833.  Longfleet is also the site of the Tatnam Well which used to provide water for the town of Poole.

In the early 1870s, Longfleet was "a tything and a chapelry in Canford Magna parish [about] 1 mile NNE of Poole town and r. station; and includes part of the town and of the harbour..." It covered an area of 1,458 acres, 285 of which were water. Poole Workhouse was located in the tything, housing 102 inmates in 1861. There was also a manor owned by Sir J. B. Guest, Bart.  There is a national school.

Originally consecrated in 1833, the Church of Longfleet St Mary (CofE) was built chiefly at the expense of Lord de Mauley and designed by Edward Blore. In the 1870s, the chapelry, which was more extensive than the tything, had a population of 1,598 and 317 houses. The living was (and still is) a vicarage in the diocese of Salisbury. Its patron then was Sir J. B. Guest. The prominent spire was added in 1884 and additional building work carried out in 1915. In 1995 the church was designated as a Grade II listed building.

Population 
In 1851, Longfleet had a population of 1,287. In 1861, it had grown to 1,417 and there were 288 houses.

Today
The vast majority of land use is for private residential dwellings, the majority being Victorian and Edwardian era terraces.  However the NHS hospital Poole General covers a vast area of the district, with the main site located on the east side of Longfleet Road and the maternity unit is situated on St Mary's Road, which runs north-easterly from Longfleet Road.  The site of the maternity unit and the adjacent private hospital was once the site of a workhouse built in 1839.  It was used eventually as a wing of the maternity hospital, but was demolished in 1979.

The district is dominated by the spire of St. Mary's Church which stands near the brow of the hill. It can be seen from some miles around and is described by English Heritage as one of the "landmarks of Poole". In 2014, a new church centre was opened opposite the main church in Kingston Road. The church has a congregation of around 700, which makes it the largest in the Diocese of Salisbury.

Retail outlets include a BP petrol forecourt, and small private businesses such as convenience stores and take-aways, there are also two local doctor surgeries Longfleet House surgery, and The Adam Practice which sits on part of the site of the original Longfleet School.

The local school is Longfleet Church of England VC Primary School, which moved from Longfleet Road to a new purpose-built building off Joliffe Road at Joliffe Avenue in 1996.

Longfleet Road also features a green area beneath which were World War II air-raid shelters for the area.

The district is located in the Poole Town Ward for the purposes of local council elections for the Borough of Poole. The Church of England parish of Longfleet is split between Poole Town Ward and Oakdale Ward.

There is also a football team called Longfleet F.C.

References

External links

Areas of Poole